The 2021 Mecklenburg-Vorpommern state election was held on 26 September 2021 to elect the 8th Landtag of Mecklenburg-Vorpommern. The incumbent government is a coalition of the Social Democratic Party (SPD) and Christian Democratic Union (CDU) led by Minister President Manuela Schwesig.

The SPD won a landslide plurality of almost 40% of votes, a nine percentage point increase from 2016. The opposition Alternative for Germany (AfD) remained the second largest party but declined to under 17%. The CDU recorded its worst ever result in the state with 13.3%, while The Left also declined to 10%. Alliance 90/The Greens and the Free Democratic Party (FDP) both won around 6% of votes and re-entered the Landtag after previously falling out in 2016 and 2011, respectively.

After the election, the SPD chose to form a coalition with The Left rather than renew their government with the CDU. Schwesig was re-elected as Minister-President on 15 November with 41 votes out of 79.

Election date
The Landtag is elected for a period of five years in accordance with Article 27 of the Constitution of Mecklenburg-Vorpommern. An election may be held between 58 and 61 months after the first sitting of the previous Landtag. As the 7th Landtag first sat on 4 October 2016, the election must be held between 4 August to 4 November 2021. It must take place on a Sunday.

On 12 January 2021, the state government designated 26 September as the date of the election, coinciding with the federal parliamentary election.

Electoral system
The Landtag is elected via mixed-member proportional representation. 36 members are elected in single-member constituencies via first-past-the-post voting. 35 members are then allocated using compensatory proportional representation. Voters have two votes: the "first vote" for candidates in single-member constituencies, and the "second vote" for party lists, which are used to fill the proportional seats. The minimum size of the Landtag is 71 members, but if overhang seats are present, proportional leveling seats will be added to ensure proportionality. An electoral threshold of 5% of valid votes is applied to the Landtag; parties that fall below this threshold are excluded from the Landtag.

Background

In the previous election held on 4 September 2016, the SPD remained the largest party with 30.6% of the vote, a loss of 5.0 percentage points. Alternative for Germany (AfD) contested their first election in Mecklenburg-Vorpommern, placing second with 20.8%. The CDU won 19.0%, a loss of 4.0 points, while The Left won 13.2%, a loss of 5.2 points.

The SPD–CDU coalition which had governed since 2006 retained its majority and was renewed for a third term.

Parties
The table below lists parties currently represented in the 7th Landtag of Mecklenburg-Vorpommern.

Campaign

Lead candidates
On 7 August 2020, the state CDU elected Michael Sack, district administrator of Vorpommern-Greifswald, as its new leader. He was also selected as the party's lead candidate for the 2021 state election.

On 28 January 2021, parliamentary group leader Simone Oldenburg was nominated as lead candidate for The Left.

Opinion polling

Results

Aftermath
Minister-President Schwesig claimed victory after the release of exit polls and spoke of "a wonderful evening for our state and the SPD." CDU leader Michael Sack and general-secretary Wolfgang Waldmüller both described the party's result as a "catastrophe". Despite the AfD's losses, state chairman Leif Erik-Holm voiced his satisfaction with the result, particularly the decline of the CDU. Simone Oldenburg, the lead candidate for The Left, stated that the result was a mandate for a shift to the left in the government. Harald Terpe of the Greens described their performance as "promising" but said that many of the party's key issues are still not a high priority for the state's voters.

Government formation
The SPD declined to commit to a coalition partner after the election, but a two-party government with either the CDU or The Left was mathematically possible. A traffic light coalition with the Greens and FDP also holds a majority. Minister President Schwesig described a "stable majority" with "reliable partners" as key to the formation of a new government.

On 13 October 2021, Schwesig announced the SPD would enter coalition talks with The Left. She stated her motivations for reorienting the coalition as a desire for "a new departure", and described The Left as a "social, pragmatic party" with decisive policy overlap with the SPD. She said that The Left had been a reliable partner to the government even while in opposition, and had assumed "state-political responsibility" during the COVID-19 pandemic.

A coalition agreement between the SPD and The Left was agreed to on 5 November and signed on 13 November. Schwesig was re-elected as Minister-President on 15 November with 41 votes in favour, 35 against, and three abstentions. In the new cabinet, the SPD has six ministers and the Left has two: Simone Oldenburg as education minister and Jaqueline Bernhardt as justice minister.

References

2021 elections in Germany
Elections in Mecklenburg-Western Pomerania
Opinion polling in Germany